Dundreich is a hill in the Moorfoot Hills range, part of the Southern Uplands of Scotland. Its close proximity to Edinburgh allows for an almost unimpeded view towards the city, as well as into the Pentland Hills and surrounding counties. Tied with Whitehope Law as the lowest Moorfoot Donald, it is most frequently climbed from the Gladhouse Reservoir to the north, often as part of a round of the neighbouring hills.

References

Mountains and hills of the Southern Uplands
Mountains and hills of the Scottish Borders
Donald mountains